Jeff Olson may refer to:

 Jeff Olson (alpine skier) (born 1966), American Olympic alpine skier
 Jeff Olson (American football), American football coach, former head coach at Southern Oregon University
 Jeff Olson (musician) (born 1962), American drummer
 Jeff Olson (singer), the cowboy in the musical group Village People
 Geoffrey Olsen (1943–2007), Welsh artist